The 1987 Winfield Australian Masters was a professional non-ranking snooker tournament that took place between 29 June and 8 July 1987 at the North Sydney Anzac Memorial Club in Sydney, Australia. Stephen Hendry won the tournament by defeating Mike Hallett 371–226 in the final. All matches were decided on the aggregate score over five .

The defending champion was Dennis Taylor, who did not participate in the 1987 event as the players managed by Barry Hearn were withdrawn from the event because of a dispute with promoter Eddie Charlton over air fares. The withdrawn players, who were Taylor, Steve Davis, Jimmy White, Willie Thorne, Terry Griffiths, Neal Foulds and Tony Meo, were replaced by Hendry, Dene O'Kane, Dean Reynolds, Mike Hallett, Eugene Hughes, Alex Higgins and John Parrott. Four places were given to specific Australian players. Paddy Morgan and Glen Wilkinson won places at the event by qualifying from an elimination tournament consisting of the Australian professional players other than the four who were given automatic places.

Following a first round win over John Campbell, Hendry defeated top seed Thorburn in the quarter-finals, and Higgins in the semi-final. In the other half of the draw, Hallett beat Hughes in the first round, then having led Johnson by 86 going into the last of their five frames, won that match by seven points. In the final, Hendry scored higher than Hallett in four of the five frames played, and won 371–226. Higgins scored the highest  of the tournament, 115, in his match against John Parrott.

Prize fund 
The tournament was sponsored by Rothmans under their Winfield brand name. The total prize fund was $200,000, awarded as shown below:

Winner: $50,000
Runner-up: $30,000
Third place: $20,000
Fourth place: $17,000
Quarter-finalists: $10,000
Last 16: $5,000
Highest break: $3,000

Main draw
The numbers shown to the left of the players' names are their seedings. All matches were decided on the aggregate score over five frames. Match winners are shown in bold.

References

Australian Goldfields Open
1987 in Australian sport
1987 in snooker